The Collar City Bridge (also known as the Hoosick Street Bridge) carries NYS Route 7 (NY 7) across the Hudson River connecting Colonie, New York with Troy, by way of passing over Green Island.  Though the northern terminus of Interstate 787 (I-787) is unclear, there is sign evidence of a concurrency at least halfway across the bridge.

History

The bridge had been planned since the 1950s, but did not open to traffic until 1981 connecting Troy and Green Island to I-787. By the end of the decade, the Route 7 Freeway was completed with a connection to the bridge.  The bridge's official name, a reference to the City of Troy's nickname, was selected by an elderly couple in nearby Berlin.

See also
 
 
 
 List of fixed crossings of the Hudson River

References

 

Bridges over the Hudson River
Bridges completed in 1981
Road bridges in New York (state)
Interstate 87 (New York)
Bridges on the Interstate Highway System
Bridges in Rensselaer County, New York
Bridges in Albany County, New York
Girder bridges in the United States